Marc Dile (born May 5, 1986) is a gridiron football offensive lineman who is a free agent. He was signed by the Tampa Bay Buccaneers as an undrafted free agent in 2009. He played college football at South Florida.

After surviving final cuts at the end of training camp, Dile remained on the Buccaneers' roster for 5 weeks.  However, he was declared inactive by the team for all games during this portion of the season.  Following the fifth game of the season, Dile was waived by the team for purposes of transferring him to their Practice Squad, where he remained for the rest of the season. He was cut on September 3, 2011. On June 22, 2015, he was activated by the Orlando Predators.

Biography
Marc Dile is born to parents of Haitian descent.

References

External links
Winnipeg Blue Bombers bio 
Hamilton Tiger-Cats bio 
Tampa Bay Buccaneers bio
USF Bulls bio

1986 births
Living people
Players of American football from Orlando, Florida
Players of Canadian football from Orlando, Florida
American football offensive tackles
American football offensive guards
American sportspeople of Haitian descent
Canadian football offensive linemen
American players of Canadian football
South Florida Bulls football players
Tampa Bay Buccaneers players
Orlando Predators players
Hamilton Tiger-Cats players
Winnipeg Blue Bombers players